King of Cards is the fourth studio album from British singer-songwriter Tom McRae, released on 14 May 2007. On 16 February 2007, all the tracks on King of Cards were made available for streaming on McRae's official website.

Track listing
 "Set the Story Straight"
 "Bright Lights"
 "Got a Suitcase, Got Regrets"
 "Keep Your Picture Clear"
 "Houdini and the Girl"
 "Sound of the City"
 "On and On"
 "Deliver Me"
 "One Mississippi"
 "The Ballad of Amelia Earhart"
 "Lord, How Long?"

References

2007 albums
Tom McRae albums
V2 Records albums